Rob Jungklas is an American, Memphis, Tennessee-based musician, singer and songwriter.

Jungklas worked in the Memphis-based music circuit for 15 years before signing a deal with Manhattan Records and releasing the album Closer to the Flame in 1986. The album contained the minor hit "Make It Mean Something," which reached #86 on the Billboard Hot 100. Another song, "Boystown," had a video directed by Godley & Creme (in the same rapid-jump-cut style of their video for Wang Chung's "Everybody Have Fun Tonight"). "Hello Heaven," another song on the album, appeared on the soundtrack of the 1987 movie The Principal.

Jungklas recorded a second album that was not released; Jungklas later released the album through his own website under the title Wrestle With Angels. He then moved to RCA Records, where his album Work Songs for a New Moon was released in 1989. The album was not a commercial success, and he left the label. Jungklas then left the music business; he married, earned a college degree and got a job teaching English and science at the Hutchison School in Memphis. He later moved to St. George's Independent School in Collierville, Tennessee to work as a 7th grade science teacher. Jungklas began playing music again in 2001, and released the album Arkadelphia in 2003 on Memphis-based label Madjack Records. Its blues-based sound was a major departure from his rock-oriented 1980s releases. Jungklas played several shows opening for Lucinda Williams in support of the album. Jungklas released another blues-based album, Gully, in 2007.  In August 2010, he released Mapping the Wreckage. Madjack released Jungklas' The Spirit And The Spine in November 2013.

Jungklas said that while he's proud of his pop-oriented work in the 1980s, "in my mind, I'm really a blues artist ... folk and blues. People might roll their eyes when I say that. But in my head, that's what it is."

Discography
Romeos (1983)
Closer to the Flame (1986)
Work Songs for a New Moon (1989)
Arkadelphia (2003)
Gully (2007)
Mapping the Wreckage (2010) 
The Spirit And The Spine (2013)
Nothing to Fade (2014)
7 Sisters (2015)
Blackbirds (2017)
Rebel Souls (2022)

References

External links
Rob Jungklas' website
Rob Jungklas' Bandcamp page

Living people
Singers from Tennessee
People from Memphis, Tennessee
Musicians from Memphis, Tennessee
Year of birth missing (living people)
Place of birth missing (living people)